Shaba' is a sub-district located in Hubaysh District, Ibb Governorate, Yemen. Shaba' had a population of 5053 according to the 2004 census.

References 

Sub-districts in Hubaysh District